Holoplatys is a genus of the spider family Salticidae (jumping spiders).

Description
Holoplatys have a long, flat, oval cephalothorax, which is truncated anteriorly, and a long, flat, oval abdomen. They are often found under the bark of trees, especially eucalyptus. They have a resemblance to Marpissa.

Species
 Holoplatys apressus (Powell, 1873) – New Zealand
 Holoplatys bicolor Simon, 1901 – Queensland, Western Australia
 Holoplatys bicoloroides Zabka, 1991 – Western Australia
 Holoplatys borali Zabka, 1991 – Western Australia
 Holoplatys braemarensis Zabka, 1991 – Queensland
 Holoplatys bramptonensis Zabka, 1991 – Queensland
 Holoplatys canberra Zabka, 1991 – Australian Capital Territory
 Holoplatys carolinensis Berry, Beatty & Prószynski, 1996 – Caroline Islands
 Holoplatys chudalupensis Zabka, 1991 – Western Australia
 Holoplatys colemani Zabka, 1991 – Queensland, New South Wales
 Holoplatys complanata (L. Koch, 1879) – Queensland, Northern Territory, New Guinea
 Holoplatys complanatiformis Zabka, 1991 – Queensland, New South Wales
 Holoplatys daviesae Zabka, 1991 – Queensland, New South Wales
 Holoplatys dejongi Zabka, 1991 – Western Australia
 Holoplatys desertina Zabka, 1991 – Western Australia, South Australia
 Holoplatys digitatus Zhang et al., 2017 – South China and Thailand
 Holoplatys embolica Zabka, 1991 – Queensland
 Holoplatys fusca (Karsch, 1878) – Western Australia to Queensland
 Holoplatys grassalis Zabka, 1991 – Western Australia
 Holoplatys invenusta (L. Koch, 1879) – Queensland, New South Wales, Victoria
 Holoplatys jardinensis Zabka, 1991 – Queensland, New Guinea
 Holoplatys julimarina Zabka, 1991 – Western Australia
 Holoplatys kalgoorlie Zabka, 1991 – Western Australia
 Holoplatys kempensis Zabka, 1991 – Northern Territory
 Holoplatys lhotskyi Zabka, 1991 – Queensland, Tasmania
 Holoplatys mascordi Zabka, 1991 – New South Wales, South Australia
 Holoplatys meda Zabka, 1991 – Western Australia
 Holoplatys minuta Zabka, 1991 – Queensland
 Holoplatys oakensis Zabka, 1991 – Queensland
 Holoplatys panthera Zabka, 1991 – South Australia
 Holoplatys pedder Zabka, 1991 – Tasmania
 Holoplatys pemberton Zabka, 1991 – Western Australia
 Holoplatys planissima (L. Koch, 1879) – Western Australia to Queensland
 Holoplatys planissima occidentalis Thorell, 1890 – Sumatra
 Holoplatys queenslandica Zabka, 1991 – Queensland, New Guinea
 Holoplatys rainbowi Zabka, 1991 – Queensland
 Holoplatys semiplanata Zabka, 1991 – Eastern Australia, New Caledonia
 Holoplatys strzeleckii Zabka, 1991 – South Australia, Tasmania
 Holoplatys tasmanensis Zabka, 1991 – Tasmania
 Holoplatys windjanensis Zabka, 1991 – Western Australia

Footnotes

References
  (2000): An Introduction to the Spiders of South East Asia. Malaysian Nature Society, Kuala Lumpur.
  (2007): The world spider catalog, version 8.0. American Museum of Natural History.

External links
  Chink Jumping Spider - Holoplatys sp. (photographs and description)

Salticidae
Spiders of Australia
Spiders of Oceania
Spiders of New Zealand
Salticidae genera